Tan Seng Giaw (born 26 May 1942) is a veteran Malaysian from the Democratic Action Party (DAP).

Background
He was born on 26 May 1942 in Kota Bharu, Kelantan. After attending Primary and High School in Kelantan and Penang respectively, he furthered his education at Plymouth College and Leeds University, England. His multi-cultural academic and social background has resulted in Seng Giaw being fluent in Mandarin, English, Bahasa Malaysia, and competent in the writing of Malay in the Jawi script. Seng Giaw's academic qualifications include a M.B.Ch. B. (Leeds), D. Obs. R.C.O.G, M.R.C.P (UK) and finally a M.D. honours (Leeds) in 1976.

An active participant in student activities, he represented the Leeds Medical School on the British Medical Student's Association for five years, and was a founding member of the Chinese Society of the University of Leeds, where he held the office of Society President during 1965–66. His social activities include the office of Pengerusi Kehormat of Persatuan Murid-murid Tua, Chung Ling for the states of Selangor, Negeri Sembilan, Pahang and Kuala Lumpur.

Over the years, Tan has gathered a wide portfolio of medical experience, having worked at various hospitals (both international and local), private practice clinics and a short period in the Royal Malaysian Army. Tan is working as a Specialist Dermatologist at the Chinese Maternity Hospital Medical Centre.

In 1972, Tan married Oon Hong Geok, a paediatrician and has two daughters. His wife used to be active in the political scene and represented Taman Aman, Petaling Jaya as a state assemblywoman.

Political career
Tan's political involvement began in 1976, during which he served the people of Kepong on behalf of Dr. Tan Chee Khoon. He was the Democratic Action Party's National Vice-chairman and Member of Parliament for the constituency of Kepong leading up to the 2018 general election (GE14).

Despite having been successful elected as the Member of Parliament (MP) of Kepong for eight consecutive terms (from 1982 to 2018), Tan was dropped as a candidate of choice for the party in GE14. This was amid the rumours nearing the GE14, and Tan's action who went on the offensive by declaring 'he will not back down' and began releasing a series of press statements including a veiled attack on DAP party leaders through an interview with Malaysian Chinese Association (MCA)'s controlled newspaper, The Star as well as UMNO controlled, New Straits Times which labeled them as 'not as honest as the late Tan Chee Koon'.

Election results

References

External links
Tan Seng Giaw's blog
Tan Seng Giaw's Parliamentary Profile

1942 births
Living people
People from Kota Bharu
People from Kelantan
Malaysian politicians of Chinese descent
Malaysian dermatologists
Malaysian military personnel
Democratic Action Party (Malaysia) politicians
Members of the Dewan Rakyat
Members of the Selangor State Legislative Assembly
People educated at Plymouth College
Alumni of the University of Leeds
21st-century Malaysian politicians